Emory Speer Richardson (August 13, 1894 – February 7 1965) was an actor who appeared in American films. He was also in numerous theatrical productions.

Richardson was born in Marshallville, Georgia. He was African American.

He had several roles in the 1931 production The Green Pastures. He portrayed Lykon in the 1946 theatrical production Lysistrata. Sidney Poitier was also in the cast.

He died after a long illness on February 7, 1965, at Sydenham Hospital, New York. He had a son named Edward Richardson.

Filmography
Beware (film) (1946) as Dean Hargreaves 
Sepia Cinderella (1947) as Great Joseph 
Boarding House Blues (1948) as Simon
The Philadelphia Story (1959 film) as Edward 
The Fugitive Kind (1960) as Uncle Pleasant, the Conjure Man

References

1894 births
1965 deaths
Actors from Georgia (U.S. state)
African-American actors
Broadway theatre people
20th-century African-American people